Marcelo Fernan Bridge, also known as Second Cebu–Mactan Bridge and the Second Bridge locally, is an extradosed cable-stayed bridge located in Metro Cebu in the Philippines. It crosses Mactan Channel connecting Mandaue in mainland Cebu to Lapu-Lapu City in Mactan Island. It is currently the second-longest cable-stayed bridge in the Philippines after Cebu–Cordova Link Expressway which also crosses the Mactan Channel. It is one of three bridges crossing Mactan Channel, the others being Mactan–Mandaue Bridge (opened in 1973) and the aforementioned Cebu–Cordova Link Expressway (opened in 2022).

History
Marcelo Fernan Bridge was opened in August 1999 to decongest the traffic from the older Mactan–Mandaue Bridge, which opened in 1973. After its completing, the bridge was one of the widest and longest bridge spans in the Philippines. The bridge was constructed with the help of the Japanese Government. It was named after Senator Marcelo Fernan, a political figure from Cebu City.

Additional information
On the Mactan Island side of the bridge, there is a park called the Millennium Park at the base of the bridge's piers, and the Filipino Seafarers Memorial is located in that park. Also, the bridge has two pedestrian walkways, one on the north side of the bridge, and one on the south side. On the Cebu Island side of the bridge, there is Mandaue, and the bridge is accessed via United Nations Avenue. The Mactan side of the bridge, which is in Lapu-Lapu City, is accessed by Old Patiller Road, a spur road of the Manuel L. Quezon National Highway.

The bridge also sits astride the northern end of the Mactan Channel, which is a gateway to the Cebu International Port which is managed by the Cebu Port Authority, where about 80% of domestic and international shipping operators and shipbuilders in the Philippines are located.

See also 
 Extradosed bridge
 Cable-stayed bridge

References

External links
 Marcelo Fernan Bridge @ Structurae
 
 WebSite for Mandaue City
 WebSite for Lapu-Lapu City
 Picture of the Filipino Seafarers Memorial.
 Picture of the Millenium Park under the bridge and another picture as well.

Extradosed bridges
Extradosed bridges in the Philippines
Landmarks in the Philippines
Cable-stayed bridges in the Philippines
Transportation in Cebu
Buildings and structures in Cebu
Buildings and structures in Metro Cebu